Saturday Night Live is an American sketch comedy series created and produced by Lorne Michaels for most of the show's run. The show has aired on NBC since 1975.

2005–2006 season

Saturday Night Live promised changes for the 2005–06 season, one of which was broadcasting in high-definition. Lorne Michaels added four new featured players: Andy Samberg, Bill Hader, Kristen Wiig (partway through the season), and Jason Sudeikis, who was added for the last three episodes of the previous season.

Hader quickly became popular for his impersonations, such as Vincent Price, Lindsey Buckingham, Al Pacino, Alan Alda, James Carville, John Boehner, Julian Assange, and many others. Hader also created multiple signature characters. These characters included New York City correspondent Stefon, Italian talk show host Vinny Vedecci, and Hollywood gossip reporter Brady Trunk as well as many others.

Hired along with Samberg were his longtime friends and The Lonely Island collaborators Jorma Taccone and Akiva Schaffer, who joined the writing staff.  The three would create a new SNL mainstay feature in the SNL Digital Shorts, the most popular being "Lazy Sunday". Wiig, who first appeared when Jason Lee hosted, gained popularity with impersonations of Drew Barrymore, Felicity Huffman and Megan Mullally, also creating memorable characters such as the Two A-Holes (with Sudeikis) and Target Lady. Lorne Michaels extended her contract until the 2009–10 season (though she wouldn't officially leave the show until the 2011–12 season).

Leaving after this season were Rachel Dratch and Tina Fey, who had committed to working on Fey's new sitcom 30 Rock, as well as Horatio Sanz, Finesse Mitchell, and Chris Parnell, who were let go due to budget cuts. Fey had missed several episodes early in the season while on maternity leave, as had Maya Rudolph. Horatio Sanz took Fey's place on Weekend Update while she was away.

Cast
 Fred Armisen
 Rachel Dratch
 Tina Fey
 Will Forte
 Darrell Hammond
 Seth Meyers
 Finesse Mitchell
 Chris Parnell
 Amy Poehler
 Maya Rudolph
 Horatio Sanz
 Kenan Thompson

Featuring
 Bill Hader
 Andy Samberg
 Jason Sudeikis
 Kristen Wiig (first episode: November 12, 2005)

bold denotes Weekend Update anchor

2006–2007 season

Cast changes
SNL had a smaller cast in the 2006–2007 season due to “massive budget cuts” at NBC. Lorne Michaels said that cutting staff was chosen over reducing from 20 the number of original episodes produced. A separate announcement confirmed the departure of Tina Fey, who left to focus on her new show 30 Rock. Rachel Dratch, one of the stars in the 30 Rock pilot (though subsequently replaced by Jane Krakowski), also did not return.

In September 2006, it was announced that Seth Meyers would replace Tina Fey as co-anchor on Weekend Update.

Kristen Wiig, Bill Hader, Andy Samberg, and Jason Sudeikis were all promoted to repertory players at the beginning of their second season (the third for Sudeikis including his role as a featured player).

The final cast list included just 11 members, the lowest number since the 1997–1998 season, and the first time since the 1997–98 season that no featured players were hired.

Cast
 Fred Armisen
 Will Forte
 Bill Hader
 Darrell Hammond
 Seth Meyers
 Amy Poehler
 Maya Rudolph
 Andy Samberg
 Jason Sudeikis
 Kenan Thompson
 Kristen Wiig

2007–2008 season

The 2007–2008 season of Saturday Night Live began on September 29, 2007 with LeBron James hosting the episode and musical guest Kanye West. Production was suspended due to the 2007 Writers Guild of America strike, after which only four episodes were produced.
The show's first episode after the writers' strike was aired on February 23, 2008, with former head writer and cast member Tina Fey as host.

Cast
 Fred Armisen
 Will Forte
 Bill Hader
 Darrell Hammond
 Seth Meyers
 Amy Poehler
 Maya Rudolph (final episode: November 3, 2007)
 Andy Samberg
 Jason Sudeikis
 Kenan Thompson
 Kristen Wiig

Featuring
 Casey Wilson (first episode: February 23, 2008)

2008–2009 season

The 2008–2009 season of Saturday Night Live began September 13, 2008 with host Michael Phelps and musical guest Lil' Wayne.

Cast
 Fred Armisen
 Will Forte
 Bill Hader
 Darrell Hammond
 Seth Meyers
 Amy Poehler (final episode December 13, 2008)
 Andy Samberg
 Jason Sudeikis
 Kenan Thompson
 Kristen Wiig

Featuring
 Abby Elliott (first episode: November 15, 2008)
 Bobby Moynihan
 Michaela Watkins (first episode: November 15, 2008)
 Casey Wilson

2009–2010 season 

The 2009–2010 season of Saturday Night Live began September 26, 2009 with host Megan Fox and musical guest U2.

Cast
 Fred Armisen
 Will Forte
 Bill Hader
 Seth Meyers
 Andy Samberg
 Jason Sudeikis
 Kenan Thompson
 Kristen Wiig

Featuring
 Abby Elliott
 Bobby Moynihan
 Nasim Pedrad
 Jenny Slate

Notes
 In early 2010, an online campaign was created on Facebook to get actress Betty White to host an episode of SNL. In March 2010, White confirmed that she would be hosting the May 8 episode. White's episode garnered around 12 million viewers, the highest since the 2008 election.
 This is the last season featuring Will Forte, who was on the show since 2002. Jenny Slate's contract was not renewed for another season.

References

2005
Saturday Night Live history 2005
Saturday Night Live 2005-2010
Saturday Night Live 2005-2010